Agnippe aulonota is a moth in the family Gelechiidae. It is found in Ecuador.

The wingspan is 7–9 mm. The forewings are slightly pale-freckled except on the edge of the dorsal streak and with a rather broad whitish-ochreous streak along the dorsum from the base to beyond the tornus, posteriorly pointed, the upper edge with two or three slight irregular prominences. There is also a small whitish-ochreous spot on costa at three-fourths. The hindwings are light grey, in males with an expansible pencil of long ochreous-whitish hairs from the costa near the base.

References

Agnippe
Moths described in 1917
Moths of South America